The 1968  Houston Oilers season was the ninth season for the Houston Oilers as a professional AFL franchise; The team would play their home games in the Houston Astrodome. The Oilers would become the first team in professional football to play their games in a domed stadium. The Oilers finished their season with a record of 7-7 and did not qualify for the playoffs.

Offseason

AFL Draft

Roster

Regular season

Season schedule

Standings

Notable Stats

References

 Oilers on Pro Football Reference
 Oilers on jt-sw.com

Houston Oilers
Houston Oilers seasons
Houston Oilers